Gräfrath or Graefrath is a district of Solingen in the German federal state of North Rhine-Westphalia, about  east of Düsseldorf.

History
There was an abbey in Gräfrath from 1185 to 1803. In the past, iron, steel, and weaving were important economic activities.

References

External links

Solingen